Callitettix is a genus of bugs in the family Cercopidae ("froghoppers") in the suborder Auchenorrhyncha and the monotypic subfamily Callitettixinae.  The recorded distribution for species is in mainland Asia: from India to southern China and Indochina.

Species 
BioLib includes the following species:
 Callitettix biformis Lallemand, 1927
 Callitettix braconoides (Walker, 1858) – type species
 Callitettix carinifrons Noualhier, 1904
 Callitettix contiguus (Walker, 1851)
 Callitettix coomani Lallemand, 1946
 Callitettix costalis Lallemand, 1933
 Callitettix proximus (Walker, 1851)
 Callitettix ruficeps Melichar, 1915
 Callitettix versicolor (Fabricius, 1794)

References

External Links

Catalogue of Life link

Cercopidae
Auchenorrhyncha genera
Hemiptera of Asia
Taxa named by Carl Stål